The 1997–98 Serie A saw Juventus win their 25th national title, with Internazionale placing second; both teams qualified for the 1998–99 UEFA Champions League. Udinese, Roma, Fiorentina, Parma qualified for the 1998–99 UEFA Cup. Lazio qualified for the UEFA Cup Winners Cup courtesy of winning the Coppa Italia. Bologna and Sampdoria qualified for the 1998 UEFA Intertoto Cup. Brescia, Atalanta, Lecce and Napoli were relegated to Serie B.

Personnel and Sponsoring

Teams and stadiums

(*) Promoted from Serie B.

League table

Results

Top goalscorers

Hat-tricks

Number of teams by region

References and sources
Almanacco Illustrato del Calcio - La Storia 1898-2004, Panini Edizioni, Modena, September 2005

References

External links

 All results on RSSSF
 1997–98 Serie A squads
 Serie A 1997/98: Classifica Marcatori 

Serie A seasons
Italy
1997–98 in Italian football leagues